Anna Lucasta may refer to:

Anna Lucasta (play), a 1944 Broadway play by Philip Yordan
Anna Lucasta (1949 film), an adaptation of the play directed by Irving Rapper, starring Paulette Goddard
Anna Lucasta (1958 film), an adaptation of the play directed by Arnold Laven, starring Eartha Kitt and Sammy Davis Jr.